Polovoz is a rural locality (a village) in Rostilovskoye Rural Settlement, Gryazovetsky District, Vologda Oblast, Russia. The population was 26 as of 2002.

Geography 
Polovoz is located 19 km south of Gryazovets (the district's administrative centre) by road. Dor is the nearest rural locality.

References 

Rural localities in Gryazovetsky District